Primnoa wingi is a species of soft coral in the family Primnoidae.

References

External links

Primnoidae
Animals described in 2005